Zumbi do Mato (roughly translated into English as "Zombie from the Grasslands") was a Brazilian experimental and noise rock band from Rio de Janeiro famous for their humorous, surreal songs, written in a stream of consciousness-esque way and filled with acerbic allusions to popular culture – referencing in particular aspects such as Western philosophy and literature, daily life in Brazil, and real-life public figures and fictional characters from different forms of media –, technobabble, scatology, nonsense, and elaborate word plays and puns. Having amassed a strong cult following throughout the mid-1990s and 2000s which lasts to the present day, the group had many different line-ups during its tenure; the only members to remain on a consistent basis were vocalist/trombonist/lyricist Löis Lancaster, keyboardist/lyricist/illustrator Marlos Salustiano, bassist/lyricist Zé Felipe (the band's only remaining founding member until his departure in 2009), and drummer Henrique Ludgero, with the noticeable absence of a guitarist. Some of their most well-known compositions are "Potinho de Anhanha", "Tiroteio do Esqueleto sem Cabeça", "O Buraco do Jabor", "O Alien que Veio pro Espaço" and "Primo Pobre do Kassin", and among their vast musical influences they count Frank Zappa, David Bowie, King Crimson, Arrigo Barnabé, Damião Experiença (with whom they played a show in 2009), Iannis Xenakis, John Cage and Tom Waits.

Zumbi do Mato was formed in 1989, and released two demo tapes by the early to mid-1990s, the eponymous Zumbi do Mato (1992) and Macacomóvel (1995), which catapulted them into fame in the underground circuit. Macacomóvel in particular caught the attention of producer BNegão (also a member of rap rock group Planet Hemp), who signed them to his label Qualé Maluco Records in 1997; their debut album, Menorme, came out through the label the following year and was lauded by the likes of singer and poet Rogério Skylab and music critic Alexandre Matias. Two follow-ups, Pesadelo na Discoteca and Adorei a Mesinha, came out in 2000 and 2005 respectively by Tamborete Records.

In 2008 the band self-released their only live album, Toma, Figurão, recorded at a gig in Niterói and initially available for free download on their now-defunct official website; as of now, it can purchased on their Bandcamp page. The album would later be included in website La Cumbuca's list of the Top 200 Brazilian Albums of the 2000s, in 121st place. In 2010 the EP Saideira do Zé, their final release with original bassist Zé Felipe (and final release overall), came out, containing studio outtakes from the Toma, Figurão sessions; the recordings, dating from 2008–09, were originally planned to be included in a deluxe physical release of Toma, Figurão which never came through. A DVD of Zumbi do Mato's performance was also scheduled to be released at some point, but those plans were eventually scrapped as well.

Zumbi do Mato played its final show on January 13, 2013, after which Löis Lancaster announced the band's end.

Legacy
Zumbi do Mato is known for its association with another famous musician of the Rio de Janeiro underground scene, Rogério Skylab; he has claimed it is one of his favorite bands and major influences, and at times has collaborated with members of the band. Skylab and Löis Lancaster sing the duet "Samba", included in his live albums Skylab II (2000) and Skylab IX (2009), and he was also a guest musician on the band's 2000 album Pesadelo na Discoteca (on the track "São Abdul"). Zé Felipe and Marlos Salustiano co-wrote a handful of tracks of Skylab's 2007 album Skylab VII, and in 2009 Felipe and Skylab released a collaborative album, Rogério Skylab & Orquestra Zé Felipe, originally intended as a full-fledged collaboration between him and Zumbi do Mato. Lancaster was also an interviewee for Skylab's talk show Matador de Passarinho.

A documentary about Zumbi do Mato's history, entitled Quem É Mais Idiota do que Eu?, was directed by Vítor Rocha and released to YouTube in 2017. To celebrate the film's release, the band's catalogue was remastered and re-released digitally by Deckdisc.

Lancaster released his debut solo album, Malva, in 2017. Besides his musical career, he published in 2003 the short poetry anthology Ceneida, and also co-wrote the experimental novel Palmyra with Eliana Pougy, which came out in 2011 by Confraria do Vento.

Marlos Salustiano released his first solo album, Animal Apócrifo, back in 2001. As fine artist he did one individual show in 2004, called "Macróbios 1,5" in Goiânia (CCC - Centro Cultural Chafariz) and took part in the collective "Art Takes Time Square" in 2012.    
More recently, in 2017, as "MarSaL" (contraction of his former artistic name), he launched his second solo album "AUTOMEMETERONIMONOMANO", a surreoconcrette sonic adventure with special guests Gustavo Jobim (former Zumbi keyboardist), Julian Quilodran (Módulo 1000) and Péricles Cavalcanti, paying homage to Noigandres, seminal Brazilian group of concrete poetry formed by Décio Pignatari, Haroldo de Campos and Augusto de Campos (with whom Marlos exchanged letters and sent a copy of Menorme in 1997).

Discography

Studio albums

Live album

Extended play

Demos

Members

Final line-up
 Löis Lancaster – vocals, trombone (1994–2013), bass guitar (2010–2013)
 Gustavo Jobim – keyboards (2005–2013)
 Sandro Rodrigues – drums (2010–2013)

Former members
 Tadeu Aor – vocals (1989)
 Alessandro "Fumê" Camacho – vocals (1989–1994)
 Zé Felipe – bass guitar (1989–2009)
 André Mansur – bass guitar (2010)
 Luciano Callado – keyboards (1989)
 Marlos Salustiano – keyboards (1990–2000)
 Ricardo Dias – keyboards (2000–2005)
 Érico Garcia – drums (1989–1992)
 Bernardo Carvalho – drums (1995–1998)
 Marcelo Pancinha – drums (1998)
 Henrique Ludgero – drums (1998–2005)
 David Oliveira – drums (2006)
 Renzo Braz – drums (2006–2010)
 Fábio Bola – electronic drum (2010)

Notes

References

External links
 Zumbi do Mato on Bandcamp
 Zumbi do Mato on Discogs

Musical groups established in 1989
Musical groups disestablished in 2013
1989 establishments in Brazil
2013 disestablishments in Brazil
Musical groups from Rio de Janeiro (city)
Brazilian rock music groups
Brazilian experimental rock groups
Brazilian noise rock groups
Comedy rock musical groups
Math rock groups
Brazilian musical trios
Obscenity controversies in music
Brazilian psychedelic rock music groups